Madelyn E. Reiter (October 24, 1942 – December 28, 2020) was an American politician and businesswoman.

Early life and education 
Born in Saint Paul, Minnesota, Reiter graduated from Alexander Ramsey High School. She earned a Bachelor of Science degree in business and economics at University of Minnesota.

Career 
Reiter served in the Civil Air Patrol. She also worked in the insurance business and lived in Shoreview, Minnesota with her husband and family. Reiter served on the Minnesota Board on Aging from 1992 to 1996 and on the Shoreview City Council from 1996 to 2000. She was a Republican. From 2001 to 2006, Reiter served in the Minnesota Senate.

Personal life 
Reiter died on December 28, 2020, in Shoreview, Minnesota.

References

1942 births
2020 deaths
Politicians from Saint Paul, Minnesota
People from Shoreview, Minnesota
People of the Civil Air Patrol
University of Minnesota alumni
Businesspeople from Saint Paul, Minnesota
Women state legislators in Minnesota
Minnesota city council members
Republican Party Minnesota state senators
Women city councillors in Minnesota
21st-century American politicians
21st-century American women politicians